European Skateboarding Championships is a sports championships in Europe.

Park skateboarding

Editions

Medalists
Men

Women

Street skateboarding

Editions

Medalists
Men

Women

See also
 World Skateboarding Championship

References